Stanton upon Hine Heath is a civil parish in Shropshire, England.  It contains 15 listed buildings that are recorded in the National Heritage List for England.  Of these, one is are listed at Grade I, the highest of the three grades, one is at Grade II*, the middle grade, and the others are at Grade II, the lowest grade.  The parish contains the village of Stanton upon Hine Heath and smaller settlements, and is otherwise rural.  Most of the listed buildings are farmhouses, farm buildings and houses, the older of which are timber framed or have a timber-framed core.  The other listed buildings are a 12th-century church and items in the churchyard, a country house and associated structures, and a milepost.


Key

Buildings

References

Citations

Sources

Lists of buildings and structures in Shropshire